Abruzzo Sheepdog may refer to two closely related breeds of sheep dog widely used and likely originating in Abruzzo, Italy:
 Maremma-Abruzzese Sheepdog
 Abruzzese Mastiff

See also
Cane Toccatore, a sheep dog often used in Abruzzo and other regions of Italy.